The International Union of Architects (French: Union internationale des Architectes; UIA) is the only international non-governmental organization that represents the world's architects, now estimated to number some 3.2 million in all.

About 
The UIA was founded on 28 June 1948 in Lausanne, Switzerland, following the merger of the Comité permanent international des Architectes and the Réunion International des Architectes.  Its General Secretariat is located in Paris. The organisation is recognised as the only global architecture organisation by most United Nations agencies, including UNESCO, UNCHS, ESOSOC, UNIDO and the World Health Organization as well as the WTO. The current (2021-2023) president is José Luis Cortés from Mexico.

Through its Member Sections, the UIA is represented in over 100 countries and territories, geographically grouped into five regions: 

 Region I: Western Europe
 Region II: Eastern Europe 
 Region III: The Americas
 Region IV: Asia and Oceania
 Region V: Africa

Governing bodies 
The governing bodies of the UIA are: 

 The Assembly: the supreme body of the UIA  composed of delegates from  UIA Member Sections in addition to Council members.
 Council: between meetings of the Assembly, the Council is responsible for managing and directing the affairs of the Union. It is composed of 4 elected members from each of the UIA's five regions in addition to the Bureau members.
 Bureau: composed of the President, the Immediate Past President, the Secretary General, the Treasurer, and a Vice-President from each Region

Presidents 

 Sir Patrick Abercrombie, United Kingdom (1948-1953)
 Jean Tschumi, Switzerland (1953-1957)
 Hector Mardones Restat, Chile (1957-1961)
 Sir Robert Matthews, United Kingdom (1961-1965)
 Eugene Beaudouin, France (1965-1969)
 Ramon Corona Martin, Mexico (1969-1972)
 Georgui Orlov, USSR (1972-1975)
 Jai Rattan Bhalla, India (1975-1978)
 Louis de Moll, USA (1978-1981)
 Rafael De La Hoz, Spain (1981-1985)
 Georgi Stoilov, Bulgaria (1985-1987)
 Rod Hackney, United Kingdom (1987-1990)
 Olufemi Majekodunmi, Nigeria (1990-1993)
 Jaime Duro, Spain (1993-1996)
 Sara Topelson, Mexico (1996-1999)
 Vassilis Sgoutas, Greece (1999-2002)
 Jaime Lerner, Brazil (2002-2005)
 Gaetan Siew, Mauritius (2005-2008)
 Louise Cox, Australia (2008-2011)
 Albert Dubler, France (2011-2014)
 Esa Mohamed, Malaysia (2014-2017)
 Thomas Vonier, USA (2017-2021)
 José Luis Cortés, Mexico (2021-2023)

Congresses 
The UIA World Congresses are key events for professional and cultural exchange among all the world's architects, bringing together thousands of participants from around the globe. Each event focuses on a different architecture-related theme, developed by eminent personalities from the international architectural, planning and construction fields. Debates, exhibitions, tours and networking events make the UIA Congresses the perfect meeting place for experts, colleagues, friends, and students of architecture.

UIA Congresses are organised by a host UIA Member Section. Congress bids are submitted to the UIA General Assembly and selected by vote six years in advance of the event.

List of congresses from 1948 to 2026

UIA Gold Medal 
Since 1984 the organisation also awards the UIA Gold Medal to honour an architect (or group of architects) having distinguished themselves through their work and professional practice by the quality of services rendered to man and society. Past recipients of the award were:

UIA Triennial Prizes 
The UIA also awards the following five prizes:

 The Patrick Abercrombie Prize for Urban Planning and Design
 The Auguste Perret Prize for Technology in Architecture
 The Jean Tschumi Prize for Architectural Writing & Critique
 The Robert Matthew Prize for Sustainable & Humane Environments
 The Vassilis Sgoutas Prize for Implemented Architecture Serving the Impoverished

International design competitions 
The UIA manages international architecture competitions.
Georges Pompidou Centre, Paris
Indira Gandhi Centre, New Delhi
Bibliothèque Nationale de France, Paris
National Museum of Seoul
Prado National Museum, Madrid (rehabilitation and extension)
Opera House, Sydney

References

External links 
 UIA official website

Architecture groups
International organizations based in France
Architectural competitions
Organizations based in Paris
International professional associations
Organizations established in 1948